Kyhosia is a monotypic genus of flowering plants in the family Asteraceae containing the single species Kyhosia bolanderi, which is known by the common names Bolander's madia and kyhosia.

This plant was included in genus Madia until 1999, when it was separated and a new genus was created for it. The new genus is named for UC Davis botanist Donald Kyhos.

Range
Kyhosia is native to the mountains of California from the Sierra Nevada north to the Klamath Mountains, where its distribution extends into southern Oregon. It is a plant of mountain meadows and other moist areas such as streambanks.

Description
Kyhosia is a perennial herb which may exceed a meter in height. Its slender stem is bristly and covered in dark-colored, stalked resin glands. The bristly linear or lance-shaped leaves may be up to 30 centimeters long; those occurring oppositely along the stem are sometimes fused together at the bases. Those further up the stem are much smaller and alternately arranged.

The inflorescence is made up of one or more flower heads at the top of the stem. Each head has a bell-shaped involucre of bristly, glandular phyllaries at the base, a center of black-tipped yellow disc florets, and a fringe of 8 to 12 golden ray florets roughly 1 centimeter long. The fruit is a club-shaped achene just under a centimeter long; achenes arising from the disc florets have pappi of scales.

References

External links
Jepson Manual Treatment: Kyhosia
USDA Plants Profile for Kyhosia
Flora of North America: Kyhosia bolanderi
University of Hawaii Botany: Kyhosia
UC Photos gallery: Kyhosia bolanderi

Monotypic Asteraceae genera
Flora of California
Flora of Oregon
Flora of the Cascade Range
Flora of the Klamath Mountains
Flora of the Sierra Nevada (United States)
Taxa named by Asa Gray
Madieae
Flora without expected TNC conservation status